Takara (宝 or 高良) is a Japanese surname. Notable people with the surname include:

 Tetsumi Takara (高良 鉄美), Japanese politician
 Ryoko Takara (高良 亮子), Japanese football player

See also 

 Japanese name
 Okinawan name

Japanese-language surnames
Okinawan surnames